The first Indian vice presidential election was held in 1952. Sarvepalli Radhakrishnan was elected unopposed as the first Vice-President. Had the election been contested by more than one candidate, the poll would have occurred on 12 May 1952.

Schedule
The election schedule was announced by the Election Commission of India on 12 April 1952.

Result
The Electoral College consisted of 735 members of Lok Sabha and Rajya Sabha. There were two candidates who filed their nominations, S. Radhakrishnan and Janab Shaik Khadir Hussain. The Returning Officer rejected the nomination of Khadir Hussain. Since he was now the only candidate left, Dr. Radhakrishnan was declared as elected unopposed to the office of the Vice-President on 25 April 1952.

See also
 1952 Indian presidential election

References

Vice-presidential elections in India
India
April 1952 events in Asia
Uncontested elections